The microcosmic orbit (小周天), also known as the Self Winding Wheel of the Law, is a Taoist Qigong energy cultivation technique. It involves deep breathing exercises in conjunction with meditation and concentration techniques which develop the flow of qi along certain pathways of energy in the human body which may be familiar to those who are studying traditional Chinese medicine, Qigong, T'ai chi ch'uan, Neidan and Chinese alchemy. The exercise can be performed usually at first in a sitting position, but it can also be practiced standing as in Zhan zhuang or with movements included as with T'ai chi ch'uan.

The clear understanding of the microcosmic orbit technique is very important not only because of its historical context in the story of Chinese alchemy but because it is at the heart of many Taoist forms of exercise performed throughout the world by many millions of people today.

History

The history of the microcosmic orbit dates back to prehistoric times in China, and the underlying principles can be found in the I Ching which according to legend was written by the Emperor Fu Xi approximately five thousand years ago or at least two centuries before the time of the Yellow Emperor. For example, the Chinese character for the I Ching hexagram number 5, Waiting, depicts a person sitting in meditation and the commentary pertains to the flow of energy from one of the psychic energy channels to another during meditation:

Lao Tzu and Chuang Tzu have also alluded to the technique of meditation and encouraging circulation of energy through the psychic meridians in their writings. For example, Chuang Tzu's chapter entitled Yang Sheng Chu or "Principles of Health and Longevity" states: "Use your mind to carry the vital energy along your Tu Mo upward constantly" A stone carving in the White Cloud Temple in Beijing which bears an inscription "the sixth month of the year Ping-hsu of the Kuang-hsu era" (1886) contains a pictorial representation of some of the symbols which describe the processes involved in the microcosmic orbit meditation technique. These particular techniques are derived from the Taoist Patriarch Lü Dongbin who was born in 798 AD.
Lü Dongbin was one of the Eight Immortals.

Practice

The exercise itself usually begins with preparation designed to relax the physical body and develop the ability to concentrate. Students may indeed be encouraged to practice Taoist Yoga exercises or T'ai chi ch'uan as a way of building enough energy to begin performing the microcosmic orbit exercise as it can induce a strain on the nervous system and cause energy depletion if practiced without adequate preparation.

To begin with the student is encouraged to develop deep abdominal breathing into the primary dantian or Taoist energy centre to develop heat and pressure in the lower abdomen or "Golden Stove". A preparatory exercise known by some as the Lesser Heavenly circulation involves moving energy between two areas known as the seat of fire near the heart or the solar plexus where a psychic centre symbolised by the trigram Li from the I Ching is located, and the seat of water in the area of the kidneys where a psychic centre symbolised by the trigram kan is located.

Normally essence or jing can flow either way through the eight extra meridians or energy pathways in the body, but in the microcosmic orbit meditation exercise jing is encouraged to flow upwards along the Governor vessel during inhalation and then downwards along the conception vessel returning to the dantian on the exhalation. This means that energy flows from the dantian downwards to the base of the spine then up the back along the centre line of the body to the crown of the head, then over the head and down the front centre line of the body and back to the starting point again making a full circle or orbit. This prevents the body's natural essences from becoming depleted as they normally flow downwards from the brain or 'sea of marrow' and are lost during ejaculation or menstruation during the reproductive processes. It is this jing or essence which is responsible for the reproductive processes in the body which allow the body to rejuvenate itself as well as for the reproductive processes which give rise to offspring. Essence is also an important component in the manufacture of qi which can be translated into English as vitality or energy, the primary motive force which is life itself. This raising and lowering Jing through the microcosmic orbit and returning it to the dantian purifies the essence and transforms it intoqi or vitality.

As well as the lower dantian or cauldron there are other important points along the circuit of energy flow which include the 'three gates' which are areas where it is considered that energy may stagnate, these are the wei-lu or Tailbone gate, the Dorsal gate on the back roughly level with the heart, and the Jade pillow on the back of the head. Other important areas include the Ming Men or gate of fire on the back about level with the kidneys and the Baihui or Niwan which is directly on top of the head.

The microcosmic orbit should be viewed in the context of a variety of Taoist exercises and techniques designed to purify the body physically, mentally and spiritually, improve health and longevity, and prepare the way for meditation, and also including other techniques such as the macrocosmic orbit which means circulating energy into the other psychic energy meridians which flow around the torso and out into the arms and legs. These types of exercises are best practiced under the guidance of suitably qualified teachers who can help the beginner avoid any pitfalls and misunderstandings along the way rather than copied from books, especially if the subject may have a history of mental illness or emotional imbalance. For example, according to Lu Kuan Yu: "It is harmful to pinpoint places in the body, the very idea of which should be relinquished since it hinders the course of the inner fire and of vitality."

References

Further reading

External links
 Tao Directory

Meditation
Qigong
Falun Gong exercises
Taoist practices